1106 Cydonia, provisional designation , is a Eunomian asteroid from the central regions of the asteroid belt, approximately  in diameter. It was discovered on 5 February 1929, by astronomer Karl Reinmuth at the Heidelberg-Königstuhl State Observatory in Germany. The asteroid was named for the fruit-bearing tree Cydonia (quince). The S-type asteroid has a relatively short rotation period of 2.7 hours.

Orbit and classification 

Cydonia is a member of the Eunomia family, a prominent family of stony asteroids and the largest one in the intermediate main belt with more than 5,000 members. It orbits the Sun in the central asteroid belt at a distance of 2.3–2.9 AU once every 4 years and 2 months (1,528 days; semi-major axis 2.60 AU). Its orbit has an eccentricity of 0.13 and an inclination of 13° with respect to the ecliptic. The body's observation arc begins with its first and official discovery observation at Heidelberg in February 1929.

Physical characteristics 

In the SMASS classification, Cydonia is a stony S-type asteroid, in-line with the Eunomia family's overall spectral type.

Rotation period 

In December 2015, a rotational lightcurve of Cydonia was obtained from photometric observations by astronomers at the Etscorn Observatory in New Mexico, United States. Lightcurve analysis gave a well-defined rotation period of 2.679 hours with a brightness variation of 0.28 magnitude. In April 2017, Spanish astronomers at Puçol Observatory and other stations of the APTOG-network measured a similar period of 2.6700 hours and an amplitude of 0.10 magnitude.

Diameter and albedo 

According to the survey carried out by the NEOWISE mission of NASA's Wide-field Infrared Survey Explorer, Cydonia measures between 12.140 and 12.95 kilometers in diameter and its surface has an albedo between 0.1719 and 0.241.

The Collaborative Asteroid Lightcurve Link assumes an albedo of 0.21 – derived from 15 Eunomia, the family's parent body and namesake – and calculates a diameter of 13.26 kilometers based on an absolute magnitude of 11.7.

Naming 

This minor planet was named after the genus Cydonia in the family Rosaceae, with the fruit-bearing quince tree as its only member. The official naming citation was mentioned in The Names of the Minor Planets by Paul Herget in 1955.

Reinmuth's flowers 

Due to his many discoveries, Karl Reinmuth submitted a large list of 66 newly named asteroids in the early 1930s. This list also contained a sequence of 28 asteroids, starting with 1054 Forsytia, that were all named after plants, in particular flowering plants (also see list of minor planets named after animals and plants).

References

External links 
 Asteroid Lightcurve Database (LCDB), query form (info )
 Dictionary of Minor Planet Names, Google books
 Asteroids and comets rotation curves, CdR – Observatoire de Genève, Raoul Behrend
 Discovery Circumstances: Numbered Minor Planets (1)-(5000) – Minor Planet Center
 
 

001106
Discoveries by Karl Wilhelm Reinmuth
Named minor planets
001106
19290205